Affinity Water is a UK supplier of drinking water to 3.8 million people in parts of London, eastern and south eastern England.  The company is  owned by a consortium of Allianz, HICL and DIF Tamblin.

Affinity Water was established through the purchase of Veolia Water's UK water supply operations by Rift Acquisitions, an entity established by Morgan Stanley and M&G Investments, for £1.2 billion on 28 June 2012. The three separate Veolia Water-branded businesses: Veolia Water Central, Veolia Water Southeast and Veolia Water East were brought together as one company, under the Affinity Water brand on 1 October 2012.

Veolia Environnement retained a 10% stake in Affinity Water for five years from incorporation, using the proceeds of the disposal to reduce its debt, as part of a €5bn debt-reduction programme announced in December 2011.

In May 2017, a consortium of Allianz, HICL and DIF purchased Morgan Stanley and M&G's 90% holding, followed by Veolia's 10% holding.

Supply area
Affinity supplies three geographically distinct regions of England. The Central region serves parts of Bedfordshire, Buckinghamshire, Essex, Greater London, Hertfordshire and Surrey. The East region serves part of Essex. The Southeast region serves part of Kent.

References

External links
 
Affinity Water, Our history
 UK Companies House company no. 02546950

2012 establishments in England
Water companies of England
Companies based in Welwyn Hatfield
British companies established in 2012
Companies supplying water and sanitation to London